Mark Meek is an American politician and businessman serving as a member of the Oregon State Senate for the 20th district. He previously represented the 40th district in the Oregon House of Representatives from 2017 to 2023.

Early life and education
Meek graduated from Park College and served in the United States Air Force.

Career 
Meek is the owner of Mt. Tabor Pub and Mark's Hawthorne Pub. Meek served on the Clackamas County Planning Commission, the North Clackamas Chamber of Commerce, the committee of the Oregon Association of Realtors, and the committee of the Portland Metropolitan Association of Realtors.

He won in the Democratic primary for the state House in 2016 to replace the retiring Brent Barton, and defeated Republican candidate Evon Tekorius in the general election with 51% of the vote.

In October 2017, Meek announced he would seek re-election in 2018.

In October 2021, Meek announced he would run for the redrawn Oregon Senate District 20 against incumbent Bill Kennemer, who was appointed to the seat in February of that year. The district was drawn to have a stronger Democratic voter advantage. Meek was unopposed in the May 2022 primary.

In the November 2022 general election, Meek narrowly defeated Kennemer by just over 500 votes in the most expensive state legislative race in the history of Oregon.

Personal life
Meek and his wife, Cindy, have two children.

Electoral history

2022

References

External links
 Campaign website
 Legislative website

Date of birth missing (living people)
Living people
Democratic Party members of the Oregon House of Representatives
Hispanic and Latino American state legislators in Oregon
People from Clackamas County, Oregon
21st-century American politicians
Park University alumni
United States Air Force airmen
Year of birth missing (living people)